The Kampala Serena Hotel is a hotel in Kampala, the capital and largest city of Uganda. The hotel is rated 5-stars by the Uganda Tourism Board.

Location
The hotel is on Kintu Road on Nakasero Hill, in the centre of Kampala. The hotel is nestled among  of lawns and gardens. The hotel is adjacent to the Kampala Sheraton Hotel and the Imperial Royale Hotel. It is in the Kampala Central Division, one of the five administrative divisions of the city. The coordinates of the Kampala Serena Hotel are 0°19'08.0"N, 32°35'11.0"E (Latitude:0.318889; Longitude:32.586400).

Overview
The hotel opened on 31 July 2006, after eighteen months of renovations and refurbishment at a cost of US$30.5 million. The hotel is part of the Serena Hotels Group. It has 152 rooms, including thirteen suites, one of which is a presidential suite. During the Commonwealth Heads of Government Meeting 2007 in Kampala, the hotel hosted Queen Elizabeth II of the United Kingdom for four nights.

The hotel has its own helipad for easy transport between the hotel and Entebbe International Airport. Adjacent to the hotel is the Kampala Serena International Conference Center with a seating capacity of 1,500 and multilingual translation facilities of up to nine languages simultaneously. In 2016, the hotel is expected to undergo expansion, with the addition of 32 bedrooms, and the improvement of food, beverage, and meeting facilities.

History

International Conference Center at Serena Hotel
International Conference Center at Serena Hotel was constructed in 1975 in order to host 13th Summit of the Organization of African Unity (OAU). The hexagonal building was completed by Energoprojekt holding from Non-Aligned Socialist Federal Republic of Yugoslavia. The venue was subsequently used by Idi Amin regime for president's personal activities and according to some sources for torture of Amin's opponents and enemies.

Ownership
The Kampala Serena Hotel is owned by a consortium that includes three corporate entities; (a) Tourism Promotion Services, a division of the Aga Khan Fund for Economic Development, (b) the Uganda National Social Security Fund, (c) Proparco, a French property investment company. The table below summarizes the shareholding in the business.

Renovations
In March 2016, the hotel began renovations that will "create 36 new residential rooms, a new state-of-the-art suite, partial refurbishment and alterations of the meeting rooms and create more executive lounges and meeting rooms". The US$8 million expansion is partly funded by PROPARCO of France and is expected to last 12 months.

See also

 Kampala Capital City Authority
 Kampala Central Division
 Lake Victoria Serena Resort

References

External links
 The Kampala Serena Hotel Homepage
  Serena Adds Tanzanian Link to Its Hotels Chain
 Serena Close to Hotel Share Swap Deal: TPS East Africa to Acquire TPS Uganda
 Uganda's Leading Hotel 2015

Hotels in Kampala
Kampala Central Division
Hotel buildings completed in 1975
Hotels established in 2006